Lil' Darlin' is a live album by American pianist, composer and bandleader Red Garland which was recorded in 1959 and originally released on the Status label, a subsidiary of Prestige Records. The album was recorded at the Prelude Club in New York City at the same concert that produced Red Garland at the Prelude and Red Garland Live!.

Reception

The Allmusic review by Alex Henderson stated, "Like the other LPs that resulted from Garland's Prelude appearance, Lil' Darlin''' demonstrates that the pianist was in excellent form on that night in October 1959". C. Michael Bailey from All About Jazz in his review of the 2006 release of the complete Prelude recordings stated "There may be an argument that The Red Garland Trio at the Prelude'' is the last of the great Garland Trio recordings. The pianist performed and recorded sporadically until his death at 61 years old in 1984. But it is these Prelude sides illustrate Red Garland at top form in his craft".

Track listing
 "Li'l Darlin'" (Neal Hefti) - 10:07  
 "We Kiss in a Shadow" (Oscar Hammerstein II, Richard Rodgers) - 5:46  
 "Blues in the Closet" (Oscar Pettiford) - 4:28  
 "Like Someone in Love" (Johnny Burke, Jimmy Van Heusen) - 10:14
Recorded The Prelude Club in New York City on October 2, 1959

Personnel
Red Garland - piano
Jimmy Rowser - bass
Charles "Specs" Wright - drums

References 

1959 live albums
Prestige Records live albums
Red Garland live albums